David Solga (born 16 October 1982 in Dortmund) is a German footballer who plays as a midfielder for Borussia Dortmund II.

Career
Solga began his career in youth football in his hometown, playing for TuS Eving-Lindenhorst, before joining Brambauer SV. In 2002, he joined Lüner SV of the Oberliga (IV), before moving upwards to play for Borussia Dortmund's reserve team a year later. Four years later he moved on to Wacker Burghausen, who he helped qualify for the new 3. Liga, before moving on to Dynamo Dresden in 2009.

Drug test
In October 2008, Solga failed a drug test, testing positive for the stimulant methylpseudoephedrine. He was cleared, however, as this substance is commonly used as a decongestant, in cold remedies. The Wacker Burghausen doctor confirmed that he had prescribed the medicine for this purpose.

References

External links
 

1982 births
Living people
German footballers
Borussia Dortmund II players
SV Wacker Burghausen players
Dynamo Dresden players
2. Bundesliga players
3. Liga players
Regionalliga players

Association football midfielders
Footballers from Dortmund